Wake-Walker v SS Colin W Ltd  is a Canadian admiralty law case concerning the issue of inevitable accident. The case was decided by the Judicial Committee of the Privy Council, in an appeal affirming a ruling by the Supreme Court of Canada.

The collision between HMS Dragon and the Maplebranch 

On August 13, 1934,  under the command of Captain Frederic Wake-Walker was entering the Market (or Victoria) Basin in the harbour of Montreal, Quebec, Canada. After entering the basin, it attempted to avoid colliding into the Saguenay Trader, but it subsequently collided with an oil bunkering steamer, the Maplebranch, which was securely moored at the time of the collision.  The Maplebranch sank.  The owners of the Maplebranch sued Wake-Walker for the damages to the Maplebranch and its cargo.

Decisions of the Canadian courts

Exchequer Court 

The admiralty action was heard by Mr. Justice Demers of the Exchequer Court of Canada (Quebec Admiralty District), assisted by two nautical assessors. The plaintiffs alleged that the collision was caused solely by the improper and negligent navigation and mismanagement of Dragon by Wake-Walker.  In his defence, Wake-Walker pleaded inevitable accident, said to be caused by the maneuvering of the Saguenay Trader, which Wake-Walker was trying to avoid hitting.  On June 21, 1935, Demers J. held that Wake-Walker was liable.

Supreme Court of Canada

On a 3-2 majority, the Supreme Court of Canada upheld the finding of liability.  In his opinion for the majority, Davis J. held that when a vessel under steam collides with a moored vessel, the commander of the vessel under steam is presumed liable for the collision, and has the onus of proving that he was not negligent.  Wake-Walker had not done so. In summary, the majority stated:

Appeal to the Judicial Committee of the Privy Council 

Wake-Walker then appealed to the Judicial Committee of the Privy Council, at that time the highest court of appeal for the British Commonwealth, including Canada.  His appeal was dismissed by the Judicial Committee of the Privy Council.  The opinion was delivered by Viscount Sankey which noted:

Therefore, the Privy Council agreed with the courts below that Wake-Walker had not discharged the onus to prove that the accident had been inevitable.

Subsequent career 

In spite of the finding of liability, Wake-Walker continued to rise in the Royal Navy. Promoted to rear-admiral in 1939, he was involved in Operation Dynamo, the evacuation of Dunkirk in 1940.  Ships under his command played a key role in hunting the Bismarck in 1942, and he was heavily involved in creating the flotilla of landing craft needed for Operation Torch in North Africa,  and later the Normandy landings on D-Day.

References 

Judicial Committee of the Privy Council cases on appeal from Canada
1937 in Canadian case law
Admiralty case law
Canadian tort case law